The 2011 Dulux Trade MSA British Rally Championship was the 53rd season of the British Rally Championship. The addition of the Rally Sunseeker International to the calendar was due to bring the number of events to seven. The season begins on 26 February in Bournemouth and ends on 24 September in Yorkshire. Dulux Trade is once again the sponsor of the series, which is part of a two-year deal agreed in February 2010.

Season Summary

In September, following the International Rally Yorkshire, David Bogie and co-driver Kevin Rae were declared champions having won three out of the six events and scoring 110 points. Runners up with 100 points were Elfyn Evans and co-driver Andrew Edwards. The final podium position was taken by Jonny Greer and Dai Roberts with 95 points.

Calendar
The 2011 calendar originally consisted of seven rounds, one more event than in 2010. However, the final round of the championship, Rally Isle of Man, was cancelled in September 2011.

Drivers championship standings

Points are awarded to the highest placed registered driver on each event as follows: 20, 18, 16, 15, and so on deleting one point per placing down to one single point for all finishers.

References

External links
Official Website

British Rally Championship seasons
Rally Championship
British Rally Championship